Antennablennius simonyi, Simony's blenny, is a species of combtooth blenny found in the western Indian Ocean, from the Gulf of Aden to the Persian Gulf. The specific name honours the Austrian mathematician and entomologist Oskar Simony (1852-1915), who looked after the collection of fish specimen on an expedition to Socotra on which the type was collected.

References

simonyi
Fish described in 1902